Matthew "Matt" Howson (born 25 August 1983 in Norwich, Norfolk, England) is a British racing driver. Howson won the LMP2 class at the 2015 24 Hours of Le Mans with Richard Bradley and Nicolas Lapierre.

Career results

24 Hours of Le Mans results

References

1983 births
Living people
Sportspeople from Norwich
English racing drivers
24 Hours of Le Mans drivers
FIA World Endurance Championship drivers

KCMG drivers
Manor Motorsport drivers